Gonospira cylindrella is a species of gastropod in the Streptaxidae family. It is endemic to Réunion.

References

Gonospira
Taxonomy articles created by Polbot